Oya Aydoğan (10 February 1957 – 15 May 2016) was a Turkish actress, model, and television presenter. She was the winner of the Ses Magazine Movie Actress Contest in 1976.

She suffered from aortic aneurysm on 7 May 2016, before the Mother's Day and died on 15 May 2016 at Liv Hospital in Ulus.

Early life 
Oya Aydoğan was born on 10 February 1957 to Cemal and Güldane Aydoğan in Erzincan as the second child of her family. Until the age of eight, she lived together with her family in Beyoğlu, Istanbul.

Acting career
While at school, Aydoğan decided that she wanted to become an actress and, in 1975 she won a beauty competition titled Alev Gün, but due to the backlash from her family she was forced to return the award. In 1976, she became the winner of Ses magazine's 8th Cinema Artist Competition. At the same year she was cast in a leading role in the movie Deli Şahin opposite Cüneyt Arkın. In 1978, she joined the cast of Neşeli Günler produced by Ertem Eğilmez. After the 1980 Turkish coup d'état, she took part in movies with Arabesque theme. In 1982, she portrayed the character of Hüsniye in the movie Yedi Bela Hüsnü opposite Kemal Sunal. In 1980s, she worked as a singer in casinos. In 1986, together with Emrah she produced the movie Merhamet.

In 2007–2010, she acted in FOX's fantasy-comedy TV series Bez Bebek. In 2011, she worked as a TV presenter alongside Emel Müftüoğlu on the TV program Şekerli Kahve. Before her death, she was a presenter on Beyaz TV's program Söylemezsem Olmaz alongside Lerzan Mutlu.

Awards
In 2013, at the Uluslararası Çayda Çıra Film Festival in Elazığ she was given the "Honorary Award". For her role as Meloş in the movie Kedi Özledi she won the "Best Supporting Actress" award at the 2014 Sadri Alışık Awards. In 2015, Aydoğan together with Ferdi Tayfur were honored at Magazinci.coms  15 Year Internet Media Awards.

Personal life
In February 1978, she met Haluk Ulusoy through Suzan Avcı. 
In 1979, she married Ulusoy in secret. Due to the backlash from their families, the couple divorced after four months. Aydoğan and Ulusoy later described this marriage as a mistake in their youth. Aydoğan then lived with casino owner Tamer Taylan for a while. In 1988, she married Latif Demirbağ. Together they had a son named Gurur. They divorced in 1989.

In 2004, she revealed that she was a follower of Alevism. In 2011, she said that she could speak French with an advanced level and could also understand English; she also named Türkan Şoray as her childhood icon. She also helped Fahriye Evcen at the beginning of her career.

Death
On 8 May 2016 she underwent a 12-hour surgery due to aortic aneurysm and was put under intensive care. On 15 May 2016, while being hospitalized, she died in Istanbul at the age of 59. On 16 May 2016, she was buried at Ulus Cemetery according to her wishes.

Filmography

Movies

TV series 
 1978: Denizin Kanı
 1993: Hamuş
 1997: Fırat
 1997: Sırtımdan Vuruldum
 1998: Birisi
 2000: Evdeki Yabancı
 2002: Pembe Patikler
 2007-2010: Bez Bebek
 2007: Kısmetim Otel
 2008: Kayıp Prenses
 2011: Sudan Sebepler
 2012: Düşman Kardeşler
 2014: Şimdi Onlar Düşünsün

References

External links 
 
 

1957 births
2016 deaths
People from Erzincan
20th-century Turkish actresses
21st-century Turkish actresses
Turkish television actresses
Turkish film actresses
Turkish female models
Turkish television presenters
Burials at Ulus Cemetery
Deaths from aortic aneurysm
Turkish women television presenters